Guillermo Boyd (born 26 January 1938) is a Panamanian weightlifter. He competed in the men's bantamweight event at the 1968 Summer Olympics.

References

1938 births
Living people
Panamanian male weightlifters
Olympic weightlifters of Panama
Weightlifters at the 1968 Summer Olympics
Place of birth missing (living people)
20th-century Panamanian people